The 2005 Campeon de Campeones was the 41st edition of this Mexican Super Cup football two leg match played by:
 Apertura 2004: UNAM
 Clausura 2005: America

Match details

References

 Mexico - Statistics of season 1988/1989. (RSSSF)
 Mexico - Statistics of Mexican Supercup. (RSSSF)

Campeón de Campeones
July 2005 sports events in Mexico
2005 in Mexican sports